The aortopulmonary space  is a small space between the aortic arch and the pulmonary artery. It contains the ligamentum arteriosum, the recurrent laryngeal nerve, lymph nodes, and fatty tissue. The space is bounded anteriorly by the ascending aorta, posteriorly by the descending aorta, medially by the left main bronchus, and laterally by mediastinal pleura. 

The presence of radiodensity in this space on radiography may indicate lymphadenopathy.

References

Human anatomy